James Sholto Douglas (3 July 1757–1833) was a Scottish diplomat who was British Consul to Tangiers.

Douglas owned the Grove estate Hanover Parish, Jamaica.

He was the son of Charles James Sholto Douglas and Basilia Dawes.

References

1757 births
1833 deaths
British consuls
British slave owners